Missouri Triangle is an unincorporated community in Kern County, California.

Defined by the triple junction of California State Route 33, Lost Hills Road, and 7th Standard Road, it is entirely within the South Belridge Oil Field.  Within the triangle formed by the inexact junction of the three major roads, there is a mini-mart and a water tower, with the place name painted on the water tower.

Aera Energy LLC operates most of the oil wells in the immediate vicinity.

References

Unincorporated communities in Kern County, California
Unincorporated communities in California